The Larrakia people are a group of Aboriginal Australian people in and around Darwin in the Northern Territory.  The Larrakia, who refer to themselves as "Saltwater People", had a vibrant traditional society based on a close relationship with the sea and trade with neighbouring groups such as the Tiwi, Wadjiginy and Djerimanga. These groups shared ceremonies and songlines, and intermarried.

Name
The Larrakia were originally known as the Gulumirrgin.

Language
Larrakiya/Gulumirrgin is one of the Darwin Region languages.

Country
It extended from the Finniss River and Fog Bay in the northeast to the vicinity of Gunn Point, west of the Adam Bay mouth of the Adelaide River. Their hinterland extension ran down south to a depth of 46 miles to a point roughly 10 miles north of Rum Jungle. This last area formed a border, with an interdiction zone of about 8–10 miles deep.

Mythology
One Larrakia myth, according to one brief white account, spoke of a being, Mangarrara who lived in the heavens, at a place called Teeladla, and who created everything on earth save blackfellows. A further being, Nanganburra, lived deep in the bowels of the earth at a site called Abigooga. The latter created the first man, Dowed, instructing him how to procreate. In old age his people disobeyed him and in retribution he caused many to die. Old women refused to eat the geese he provided, so he fashioned the first spears and speared them in the legs, and a stranger, Charac, took them to a country called Toopoorānla. He refused to hand them and the children he had by them back when Dowed claimed them, and their descendants formed the Wulwulam people. Dowed took a young Adelaide River woman Abmadam, at Lingowa, and their offspring formed the Djerimanga. When Charac died he was transformed into a stone by a creek, touching which was fatal. When Abmadam died, she turned into a tree at Laylaloo, as did Dowed at Aleealee on the same Adelaide river. On dying the blacks descend to Nanganburra's land, and he judges whether their lives warrant their ascension to the stars, to dwell with Mangarrara. Those who fail the test are dispatched to a great fire at Omar. Still deeper down is a lake called Burcoot where Madjuitmadjuit, Mangarrara's friend, dwells. His function is to regulate the tides.

History

Postcontact 
In 1880 it was estimated by Paul Foelsche that the Larrakia numbered around 500 people: 100 men, 120 women, 150 youths and 130 children. Twenty years earlier a smallpox epidemic from the east is said to have decimated so many members of the tribe that they had to leave the bodies unburied.

With the passage of the Northern Territory Aboriginals Act 1910, the Chief Protector of Aborigines in the Northern Territory was appointed guardian of all Aboriginal and "half-caste" children until their maturity at 18. The authorities were thus empowered to keep in, or remove from, any Aboriginal reserve, any young person, regardless of their parents' or relatives' wishes.

In July 1911, on arriving to take up this position in Darwin, Herbert Basedow ordered a survey of Aboriginal conditions in and around the town. The Larrakia were found to be the majority of Indigenous people in the eight camps, occupying in particular two near the shore. The corrugated-hut shanties were tidy and the people in relative good health. The inspectors however reported that removals were in order, to relieve the township of these "eyesores". Basedow resigned after barely a month on duty.

Native title
As early as October 1972 the Larrakia had begun to assert their rights to land, when a 1,000 Larrakia tried to present a 3-metre long document- arguing their land was taken by British settlers, leaving the Larrakia refugees in their own country- to Princess Margaret with their signatures, on the occasion of her visit to Darwin. After the passage of the Aboriginal Land Rights (Northern Territory) Act in 1976, the Larrakia presented a formal land claim on 22 March 1979, the first move in what was subsequently described as 'the most complex and hard-fought land claim in the history of Aboriginal land rights.'

This Kenbi Land Claim pursued rights, as traditional owners, over the land, waters and islands encompassing the Cox Peninsula. The Northern Territory government fought it for some 21 years, at a cost of $20 million. In December 2000,
Justice Gray's report rejected the claims of three of the claimant groups, finding only that six people belonging to the Tommy Lyons family fell within the statutory test of 'traditional Aboriginal owners'. He therefore recommended that approximately 600 km² be handed back to the Larrakia people in a grant to an appropriate Aboriginal Land Trust, whose benefits would accrue to all 1,600 members of the Larrakia community.

A setback occurred in April 2006, when a Federal Court of Australia decision denied the Larrakia's native title claim on the basis of "failure to prove continuous connection with the Darwin area". In his reasoning Justice Mansfield argued that there had not been continuous observance of traditional customs and laws. Justice Mansfield's decision was later affirmed on appeal by the Full Federal Court.

In 2016, Prime Minister Malcolm Turnbull formally handed the land back to the Larrakia people.

Larrakia organisations
The Larrakia Nation Aboriginal Corporation was established in 1997 to represent the traditional owners of Darwin, the Larrakia. It is also the major Aboriginal service delivery organisation for the region.  Larrakia Nation has a membership of over 740 people. It is active in the areas of homeless support, community services, arts and culture, research, and Indigenous rangers. It generates nearly half of its income from fee-for-service and commercial activities. Its vision is "to be a strong, self-sufficient and healthy Nation of Larrakia people, participating fully in the wider economy of Darwin and the Northern Territory, where Larrakia language, law and culture is known, respected and valued by all members of that community".

The Larrakia Development Corporation was established in 2002 by Larrakia people with the support of the Northern Land Council. The Council holds all shares in the organisation in trust for the Larrakia people. The Larrakia Development Corporation does not have a membership base; instead, its mission is enshrined in the Larrakia Development Corporation Trust deed. Its mission is "to promote the financial independence and lifestyle of all Larrakia people through the commercial development of assets and to do so in such a way that promotes employment, training and business opportunities for all Larrakia people". The Larrakia Trade Training Centre is one initiative of the Larrakia Development Corporation

In 1998 Radio Larrakia, broadcasting on 94.5 FM, was established to serve the Aboriginal community, broadcasting in over 26 Indigenous languages, providing local communities with information, interviews, community services, music and programming.

The Gwalwa Daraniki Association owns title to the area of Larrakia land which contains the Town Camps of Kulaluk and Minmarama Park.

Alternative spellings
 Larrakia
 Larakiya, Larakeeyah, Larrakiya, Larrakeah, Larrakeeyah, Larrakiha
 Laragia, Larragea
 Larrakeeha, Larreekeeyah
 Larikia, Larrikia, Larrikiya
 Larriquia
 Binnimiginda. (term for coastal bands)
 Gunmajerrumba. (term for inland bands)
 Marri. (a southern band of the Larrakia).

Some words

 álgan (mother)
 angarak
 arkhngarramilla
 bánnaminngora. (wild dog (dingo))
 b'illinnnga. (small dog)
 dungalaba (crocodile)
 gunumijtanda. (saltwater)
 langootpa. (kangaroo).
 mámorol (large dog)
 nigan (father)
 peppee (father)
 wooding (mother)

Notable Larrakia people
 Raphael Clarke, Australian rules footballer
 Xavier Clarke, Australian rules footballer
 Ash Dargan, didgeridoo player
 Shadeene Evans, Soccer player
 Daniel Motlop, Australian rules footballer 
 Marlon Motlop, Australian rules footballer
 Shannon Motlop, Australian rules footballer
 Steven Motlop, Australian rules footballer
 Brandan Parfitt, Australian rules footballer
 Mathew Stokes, Australian rules footballer
 Miranda Tapsell, actress

Notes

Citations

Sources

Further reading
 Wells, S. (2002) Saltwater People: Larrakia Stories from Around Darwin, Larrakia Nation Aboriginal Corporation
 Day, B. (1994) Bunji: A story of the Gwalwa Daraniki Movement, AIATSIS

External links
 Larrakia Development Corporation Pty Ltd
 Larrakia Nation Aboriginal Corporation
 http://www.drbilldayanthropologist.com
 Larrakia Bibliography at Northern Territory Library
 Bibliographies of published, rare or special materials on Larrakia language and people, at the Australian Institute of Aboriginal and Torres Strait Islander Studies

Aboriginal peoples of the Northern Territory
Darwin, Northern Territory